La Búsqueda may refer to:
La Búsqueda (Argentine film), 1985
La búsqueda (TV series), 1966
The Quest (1996 film) (La búsqueda in its Spanish-language release), Jean-Claude Van Damme film